The Montezuma Falls (formerly Osbourne Falls), a horsetail waterfall on a minor tributary to the Pieman River, is located on the West Coast Range of Tasmania, Australia.

Naming
The falls draws its name from Montezuma (1466-1520), an Aztec emperor of Mexico. A mining company called the Montezuma Silver Mining Company,  formed in 1891, held leases in the area surrounding the falls.

Location and features

The  three-hour return walking track from the trackhead at the foot of Mount Read near .

Railway

The track follows much of the route of the former  narrow gauge North East Dundas Tramway and earlier views of the falls include the passing railway line.

The falls location was a stopping point on the North East Dundas tram

The proximity of the line to the falls was described in 1926:

This little railway is a "show" line of the highest order, for it dives quickly amongst the mountains, brushing the fringe of immense forests, and at one point giving a near view, of the hand- some Montezuma Falls-so near that the spray actually dashes at times against the carriage win- dows. From Williamsford one can take a motor for the five miles to Rosebery.

The railway alignment, after closing of the operation, was used for trips to view the falls.

See also

 List of waterfalls of Tasmania

References

Further reading

Waterfalls of Tasmania
West Coast Range
Horsetail waterfalls